Chris Roberts-Antieau (born 1950) is an American fiber artist based in Michigan. She characterizes her work as "embroidered tapestries", composed of fabric appliqué, thread painting and hand embroidery. She also draws, paints, and produces mixed-media work.

Early life and career 
Christine Lee Roberts-Antieau (born November 18, 1950) is an American artist, born and raised in Michigan. She is the daughter of Finch Lee Roberts and Rosemary Lee Roberts and has 3 siblings. She is the mother of Noah Antieau and the caretaker of a lineage of Bulldogs. 

In 7th grade Home Economics Class, Chris learned how to sew. A true genius from the start, her father recalled her reciting the words to “On Top Of Old Smokey”, the original version, not the childhood one about meatballs. She was just 18 months old at the time and her father realized just how gifted the mind of his daughter was. 

Chris never attended college as it wasn’t recommended for her. She signed up for one art class and after a few lessons dropped out because she never understood why an art teacher would want her art to be just like theirs. A true believer in her own thoughts and mind, Chris has stood by her inner voice. At every turn in her life, she chose to trust that voice. She developed an unwavering belief in herself, fueled by joy. She states that no matter what bad things or traumatic events have happened to her, she always finds her way back to that voice, back to joy. It’s from this place that Chris creates some of the most remarkable art of this century.

If she was a writer, she’d tell you everything on her mind, but she’s an artist and creates vast worlds through her visions that her collectors and appreciators alike can engage with through feeling. Chris isn’t one to give you the meaning or interpretation behind her work. She creates with the intention that each piece will find its way to whom it belongs by how it moves them and the connections the imagery brings to the viewers' very own hearts and minds. 

Her career as an artist began in the early 1980s. Out of a pure desire to create and live life as an artist. She began sewing three dimensional sculptures of circus folk, trapeze artists and strong men. These works would take her over 24 hours to create and she’d bring them to the craft fair and delight in the simple fact that people wanted them, even though at the time she sold these pieces for just $18!

After realizing that she could in fact sell what she was creating, she took an appliqué class and realized that she could interpret her pencil sketches and paintings into fabric art. From here, Chris began putting her drawings on fabric with the appliqué technique. She created a line of vests, jackets and handbags with her quirky and whimsical designs. She traveled the country displaying her work throughout the craft circuit and her line was picked up by a prominent retailer out of New York City. This is where her idea for the production of her art was born.

In this moment of experiencing that the world at large wanted her visions she figured out a way to make that happen. She realized she could employ other sewers to re-create her designs on fabric for this line of apparel. It wasn’t until a friend in her Michigan art studio collective recommended framing her pieces instead of putting them on bodies. That’s when Chris realized a whole new possibility for her art. 

Still traveling the craft circuit and gaining notoriety across the country for her ability to make people laugh and experience a myriad of emotions through her images, Chris found herself at the New Orleans Jazz Festival Craft Fair. She’d attended this fair many times throughout the years. There’s always a ceremony to her departure from New Orleans but this particular trip offered something different. With a van full of her work, she and her assistant, Chris Redden took their ceremonial trip through the French Quarter as they often did prior to heading back to Michigan. Chris spotted a “For Rent” sign in the window of a gallery on Royal Street and on a whim, called the number. The owner of the space answered and Chris made a simple inquiry to lease the space for a month to see if it might work out. It had only been 5 years since Katrina and the French Quarter was still on the mend with Royal street being pretty deserted. Roberts-Antieau and Redden began crossing their fingers on day one…two…three and on the fourth day, Redden went down to Saint Louis Cathedral and lit a candle. That night, a man came into the gallery and spent  $30,000.00! The Royal Street gallery has been in operation since 2010 having only moved closer into the French Quarter after hurricane Ida flooded the original gallery in 2021.

Gaining control of the sale of her work through direct ownership of her own gallery allowed Chris to spend more time in her Michigan studio. After a diagnosis of breast cancer, which Chris will say was one of the most pivotal moments of her life–one that she is deeply grateful for because she realized just how much more living she had to do–she began creating from a deeper, more introspective place in her creative channel and her Limited Series pieces were born. Still creating the joyful works, filled with sweet and comical moments with each other and our domesticated loved ones like dogs, cats and horses; Chris’ vision opened higher to the heavens and broader, yet more poignant in our everyday experiences. Themes of love, loss, grief and the interconnectedness of nature began to appear as well as her ever increasing skills with the sewing machine.

Thread painting, a free-motion embroidery technique done on a simple sewing machine, was a technique that Chris used in many of her early pieces. We can see early examples of it in how she translated a character’s hair or the fur on a dog or cat. As her animal subjects expanded outside of the domestic home to deer, birds, bears and foxes her thread painting technique evolved to a place only few can imagine replicating. 

In 2017, Chris and her team traveled to Santa Fe, NM for another “Pop-Up” experience. Met with the same enthusiastic response by locals and tourists, the Santa Fe gallery was born! 

Chris is remarkable in that her mind is capable of holding space for her artistic vision as well as her business vision. Not many artists are able to hold both pieces of this puzzle. She is often referred to as “a force”, one that inspires and elevates all who’re in her presence. She has created Antieau Gallery to house her creations and give the world an opportunity to be re-inspired, to come back to that innocent and sometimes irreverent place of joy. Her spirit is one of generosity, kindness and wonder.

Style 
Roberts-Antieau describes her work as "Embroidered Tapestries". They are made using fabric appliqué, thread painting and hand embroidery techniques, displayed in a custom wooden frame. She also works in mixed-media projects, such as her "Murder Houses", which are repurposed dollhouses depicting famous murder scenes, or her "Tragic Snowglobes", depicting tragic scenes in the traditionally joyful setting of a snowglobe. Roberts-Antieau also paints and draws one-of-a-kind works of art using gouache, pastels and graphite.

Galleries 
Chris Roberts-Antieau currently owns two galleries and a frame shop, solely dedicated to framing her art. The first gallery opened in the French Quarter of New Orleans in 2010 and is located at 719 Royal Street. The New Orleans frame shop began as a small gallery and frame shop on Magazine Street and moved to 715 Camp Street in mid 2022. The Santa Fe gallery started at 134 Water Street in the heart of the Santa Fe Plaza in 2017. In 2021 the gallery moved to a much larger location at 130 Lincoln Avenue that gives this location plenty of room to hold the annual Art Retreat.

Select Solo and Group Exhibitions 
2021	Healing And The Art Of Compassion (And Lack Thereof!)  American Visionary Art Museum. Baltimore, 

MD

2020	The Art Of Play. Antieau Gallery. Santa Fe, NM

2019	The Secret Life Of Earth: Alive! Awake! (and possibly really angry!). American Visionary Art Museum. Baltimore, 

MD

Dreaming And Doing. Antieau Gallery, Santa Fe, NM

50th Jazz & Heritage Festival. Antieau Gallery, New Orleans, LA

2018	Parenting: An Art Without A Manual. American Visionary Art Museum. Baltimore, MD

Mind and Hands. Gallery 81435. Telluride Arts District, Telluride, CO

The Myth of Certainty. Antieau Gallery. New Orleans, LA + Santa Fe, NM

2017	Ad Lucem. Gallery 81435. Telluride Arts District, Telluride, CO

New Work. Antieau Gallery, New Orleans, LA

Hey Asheville. Horse + Hero, Asheville, NC

James Brown’s Funeral. Antieau Gallery, Santa Fe, NM

Yum! The History, Fantasy and Future of Food. American Visionary Art Museum. Baltimore, MD

Sunny’s Calicoon Pop. Calicoon, NY

2016	Night Flying. Antieau Gallery. New Orleans, LA

Ephemeral Nature. Kohler Art Center. Sheboygan, WI 

The Big Hope Show. American Visionary Art Museum. Baltimore, MD

The New Orleanian. Heron Arts. San Francisco, CA

Two person Exhibition. Chelsea Underground Gallery 

Gumbo: A Celebration of Louisiana Art. Jeannie Taylor Folk Art Gallery. Sanford, FL

2015	Small Indignities. Red Truck Gallery. New Orleans, LA

Louisiana Contemporary. Ogden Museum of Southern Art.  New Orleans, LA

2014	Phantom Limb. Antieau Gallery. New Orleans, LA

Human, Soul & Machine: The Coming Singularity. American Visionary Art Museum. Baltimore, MD

2013	Gathering Stars. Antieau Gallery. New Orleans, LA

Hard Times in Mini Mall. Shooting Gallery. San Francisco, CA   

The Art of Storytelling: Lies Enchantment, Humor and Truth.  American Visionary Art Museum. Baltimore, MD

2011	What Makes Us Smile. American Visionary Art Museum. Baltimore, MD

SELECTED ART FAIRS 

2019	Market Art + Design. Hamptons, NY

Superfine! Washington, DC

2018	Superfine! Washington, DC

Texas Contemporary. Houston, TX

2017	SCOPE, Art Basel. Miami FL

LA Art Show.  Los Angeles, CA

2016	SCOPE, Art Basel. Miami FL

LA Art Show.  Los Angeles, CA

2015	SCOPE, Art Basel. Miami FL

LA Art Show. Los Angeles, CA

2014	LA Art Show. Los Angeles, CA

Art Toronto. Toronto, Ontario, Canada

2013	SCOPE, Art Basel. Miami, FL

Houston Art Fair. Houston TX

LA Art Show. Los Angeles, CA

Public Collections 
UWF Pensacola Museum of Art, Pensacola, FL.

American Visionary Art Museum, Baltimore, MD

Boxing Hall of Fame, Canastota, NY

House of Representatives, Washington, DC

Smithsonian Museum of American Art, Washington, DC

21c Museum Hotel, Oklahoma City, OK

21c Museum Hotel, Durham, NC

Filmography 
A Love Letter to Tom Waits: The Life of Chris Roberts-Antieau - A documentary about the life and work of Roberts-Antieau.

Publications 
Sew Far: The Fantastic, Incredible and Amazing Life and Work of Chris Roberts-Antieau

References 

American artists
1950 births
Living people
American embroiderers
21st-century American women artists